Saal Bulas syndrome is listed as a "rare disease" by the Office of Rare Diseases (ORD) of the National Institutes of Health (NIH). This means that Saal Bulas syndrome, or a subtype of Saal Bulas syndrome, affects fewer than 200,000 people in the US population.

Signs and symptoms

This syndrome consists of ectrodactyly or lobster-like hands, diaphragmatic hernia and absence of the corpus callosum.

In addition to these the following problems may also be present.  
abnormal alimentary tract
cardiac septal defect
low hair line in front
oligodactyly or missing fingers
respiratory distress 
stillbirth/neonatal death

Diagnosis

Treatment

History 
The syndrome was first described by American paediatricians Howard M. Saal and Dorothy I. Bulas in 1995.

References

External links
Orpha.net - A listing of Rare diseases
National Institute of Health - Office for Rare Diseases

Rare syndromes
Corpus callosum
Diseases named for discoverer